The Stars My Destination is a science fiction novel by American writer Alfred Bester. Set in the 24th or 25th century, which varies between editions of the book, when humans have colonized the Solar System, it tells the story of Gully [Gulliver] Foyle, a teleporter driven by a burning desire for revenge.

Its first publication was in book form in June 1956 in the United Kingdom, where it was titled Tiger! Tiger!, named after William Blake's 1794 poem "The Tyger", the first verse of which is printed as the first page of the novel. The book remains widely known under that title in the markets in which this edition was circulated. It was subsequently serialized in Galaxy magazine in four parts beginning with the October 1956 issue. A working title was Hell's My Destination; the book was also associated with the name The Burning Spear.

Plot

At the time when the book is set, "jaunting"—personal teleportation—has so upset the social and economic balance that the Inner Planets are at war with the Outer Satellites. Gully Foyle of the Presteign-owned merchant spaceship Nomad—an uneducated, unskilled, unambitious man whose life is at a dead end—is marooned in space when the ship is attacked and he alone survives. After six months of his waiting for rescue, a passing spaceship, the Vorga, also owned by the powerful Presteign industrial clan, ignores his signal and abandons him. Foyle is enraged and is transformed into a man consumed by revenge, the first of many transformations.

Foyle repairs the ship, but is captured by a cargo cult in the Asteroid Belt which tattoos a hideous mask of a tiger on his face. He manages to escape and is returned to Terra. His attempt to blow up the Vorga fails, and he is captured by Presteign. Unknown to Foyle, the Nomad was carrying "PyrE", a new material which could make the difference between victory and defeat in the war. Presteign hires Saul Dagenham to interrogate Foyle and find the ship and PyrE.

Protected by his own revenge fixation, Foyle cannot be broken, and he is put into a -proof prison. There he meets Jisbella McQueen, who teaches him to think clearly, and tells him he should find out who gave the order not to rescue him. Together they escape and get his tattoos removed—but not with total success: the subcutaneous scars become visible when Foyle becomes too emotional. They travel to the Nomad, where they recover not only PyrE, but also a fortune in platinum. Jisbella is captured by Dagenham, but Foyle escapes.

Some time later, Foyle re-emerges as "Geoffrey Fourmyle", a nouveau riche dandy. Foyle has rigorously educated himself and had his body altered to become a killing machine. Through yoga he has achieved the emotional self-control necessary to prevent his stigmata from showing. He seeks out Robin Wednesbury, a one-way telepath, whom he had raped earlier in the novel, and persuades her to help him charm his way through high society.

Foyle tracks down the crew of the Vorga to learn the identity of the ship's captain, but each is implanted with a death-reflex and dies when questioned. Each time, Foyle is tormented by the appearance of "The Burning Man", an image of himself on fire.

At a society party, Foyle is smitten with Presteign's daughter Olivia. He also meets Jisbella again—now Dagenham's lover—who chooses not to reveal Foyle's identity, although Dagenham has realized it anyway (Foyle's alias was implanted in his subconscious mind during Dagenham's interrogation). During a nuclear attack by the Outer Satellites, Foyle goes to Olivia to save her. She tells him that to have her, he must be as cruel and ruthless as she is.

Robin, traumatized by the attacks, tries to buy her way out of her arrangement with Foyle with the name of another Vorga crew member. Foyle agrees, but immediately reneges. In response, Robin goes to Central Intelligence to betray him.

Foyle learns that the captain of the Vorga joined a cult on Mars and has had all her sensory nerves disabled, making her immune to conventional torture. Foyle kidnaps a telepath to interrogate the captain, and learns that the ship did not rescue him because it was picking up refugees, taking their belongings, and ejecting them into space. He also learns that Olivia Presteign was the person in charge. Olivia rescues him from Martian commandos, as she sees in Foyle someone who can match her hatred and need to destroy.

Driven by a guilty conscience, Foyle tries to give himself up to Presteign's lawyer, Regis Sheffield, who is known as a Terran patriot. Sheffield turns out to be a spy for the Outer Satellites, and he captures Foyle. Sheffield tells Foyle that when the Nomad was attacked, Foyle was taken off the ship, transported 600,000 miles away, and set adrift in a spacesuit to be a decoy to attract ships to be ambushed. Instead, Foyle space-jaunted—teleporting a cosmic distance, very much further than had been previously believed possible—back to the Nomad. Now, the Outer Satellites not only want PyrE, they want Foyle as well, to learn the secret of space-jaunting.

Meanwhile, Presteign reveals that PyrE is activated by telepathy, and Robin is enlisted to trigger it to flush out Foyle. Bits of PyrE left exposed by Foyle's tests to determine its purpose cause destruction worldwide, but primarily at Foyle's abandoned encampment in St. Patrick's Cathedral, where Sheffield has brought him. The church partially collapses, killing Sheffield and trapping Foyle, unconscious but alive, over a pit of flame. Suffering from synesthesia brought on by the explosion affecting his neurological implants, Foyle  through space and time as The Burning Man. Finally he lands in the future, where Robin telepathically tells him how to escape from the collapsing cathedral.

Back in the present, Foyle is pressured to surrender the rest of the PyrE, which was protected from exploding by its Inert Lead Isotope container, and to teach mankind how to space-. He asks humanity to choose: either destroy itself or follow him into space.

Foyle now realizes the key to space-jaunting is faith: not the certainty of an answer, but the conviction that somewhere an answer exists. He  from one nearby star to another, finding new worlds suitable for colonization, but reachable only if he shares the secret of space-jaunting. He comes to rest back with the cargo cult, where the people see him as a holy man and await his revelation.

Background and influences
The Stars My Destination anticipated many of the staples of the later cyberpunk movement, for instance the megacorporations as powerful as governments, a dark overall vision of the future and the cybernetic enhancement of the body. Bester added to this mix the concept that human beings could learn to teleport, or "" from point to point, provided they know the exact locations of their departure and arrival and have physically seen the destination, similar to A. E. van Vogt's Gilbert Gosseyn in the 1948 novel The World of Null-A. There is one overall absolute limit: no one can  through outer space. A  of 1,000 miles is the maximum any jaunter is able to achieve, and even that is extremely rare. On the surface of a planet, the  rules supreme; otherwise, mankind is still restricted to using machinery. In this world, telepathy is extremely rare, but does exist. One important character is able to send thoughts but not receive them. There are fewer than half-a-dozen full telepaths in all the worlds of the solar system.

The novel can be seen as a science fiction adaption of Alexandre Dumas' The Count of Monte Cristo. It is the study of a man completely lacking in imagination or ambition, Gulliver Foyle, who is introduced with "He was one hundred and seventy days dying and not yet dead...". Foyle is a cipher, a man with potential but no motivation, who is suddenly marooned in space. Even this is not enough to galvanize him beyond the necessities of survival, finding air and food on the wreck. But everything changes when an apparent rescue ship deliberately passes him by, stirring him irrevocably out of his passivity. Foyle becomes a monomaniacal and sophisticated monster bent upon revenge. Wearing many masks, learning many skills, this "worthless" man pursues his goals relentlessly; no price is too high to pay.

Like Edmond Dantès in The Count of Monte Cristo, Foyle is thrown into prison, the supposedly -proof "Gouffre Martel" located in caverns. He establishes a clandestine connection to another prisoner, Jisbella McQueen, and through her he is educated to the point where he can conceive a plan to escape and exact his revenge. Escaping with her and locating the wreck of the Nomad, he uses its treasure, as Dantès did, to re-invent himself as Geoffrey Fourmyle.

The scenario of the shipwrecked man ignored by passing ships came from a National Geographic Magazine story that Bester had read about Poon Lim, a shipwrecked sailor who had survived four months on a raft in the South Atlantic during World War II, whom ships had passed without picking him up because their captains were afraid that the raft was a decoy to lure them into torpedo range of German submarines.

Bester once wrote that he used playful narration at one point to grab the reader's attention.

Terminology and allusions
The title "The Stars My Destination" appears in a quatrain quoted by Foyle twice during the book. The first time, while he is trapped in outer space, he states:
Gully Foyle is my name
And Terra is my nation.
Deep space is my dwelling place,
And death's my destination.

Toward the end of the novel, after he has returned to human life and become something of a hero, he states:
Gully Foyle is my name
And Terra is my nation.
Deep space is my dwelling place,
The stars my destination.

Both quatrains are based on a poetic form that was popular in England and the United States during the 18th-to-mid-20th centuries, in which a person stated their name, country, city or town, and a religious homily (often, "Heaven's my destination") within the rhyming four-line structure (see book rhyme). This literary device had been previously used by James Joyce in A Portrait of the Artist as a Young Man.

Bester may have come across his title expression in the writings of John Whiteside Parsons, one of the fathers of modern rocketry, who was also a science fiction fan and occultist. In 1943, Parsons wrote: "Rocketry may not be my True Will, but it's one hell of a powerful drive. With Thelema as my goal and the stars my destination and my home, I have set my eyes on high".

Bester's initial work on the book began in England, and he took the names for his characters from a UK telephone directory. As a result, many of the characters are named after British or Irish towns or other features: Gulliver Foyle (and his pseudonym, Fourmyle of Ceres), Robin Wednesbury, the Presteign clan, Regis Sheffield, Y'ang-Yeovil, Saul Dagenham, Sam Quatt, Rodger Kempsey, the Bo'ness and Uig ship underwriters.

Characters
 Gulliver ("Gully") Foyle: Last remaining survivor of the merchant spaceship Nomad. Captured by the "Scientific People" on an asteroid, only his face is tattooed according to their customs. The tattoos are later painfully removed, but the scars left under his skin become visible when his emotions flare out of control.
 Presteign: Head of the wealthy Presteign clan, whose interests include a chain of luxury department stores, each managed by an identical "Mr. Presto". Wealthy people like Presteign demonstrate their status by using outmoded methods of transportation and never jaunting if they can avoid it. Presteign holds court in his Star Chamber, an elaborate, old-fashioned office equipped with a bar and staffed by robots. It is designed to disorient visitors and give him the psychological edge.
 Robin Wednesbury: A Black woman, a Telesend, a one-way telepath who can send thoughts but not receive them. She discovers his deception, but he kidnaps her and rapes her to intimidate her into silence. Later, as Fourmyle, he recruits her to help him navigate the upper echelons of society. After she discovers who he really is, he offers her the prospect of finding her family, who were refugees aboard Vorga.
 Jisbella ("Jiz") McQueen: A rebellious woman, serving five years of "cure" in Gouffre Martel for larceny, she turned to crime to rebel against the limitations imposed on women to "protect" them in a world where everyone can teleport. She escapes with Foyle and takes him to a criminal doctor who is able to bleach out his facial tattoos by applying a chemical with a tattoo needle. The process is agony for Foyle, but Jisbella makes him endure it out of her disgust for him.
 Saul Dagenham: The head of a private "special services" agency contracted by Presteign to interrogate Gully Foyle and force him to reveal the location of the derelict Nomad. Dagenham was a nuclear scientist who became radioactive in an accident. He cannot remain in a room with other people for more than a short time.
 The agents of "Dagenham Couriers Inc.": A bizarre collection of freaks who specialize in "FFCC", or "Fun, Fantasy, Confusion, and Catastrophe" to carry out their missions of theft, kidnapping, and espionage.
 Peter Y'ang-Yeovil: Head of a government Central Intelligence agency based on ancient Chinese principles who is also trying to find Nomad. He is "a member of the dreaded Society of Paper Men, and an adept of the Tsientsin Image Makers". Although of Chinese descent and able to speak fluent Mandarin, he does not look Chinese.
 Olivia Presteign: Daughter of Presteign, an albino who is blind to visible light, but can see in the infrared spectrum and some radio waves. Like Jisbella, she too is in revolt against her treatment as a woman, and as a genetic anomaly. Her rebellion takes the form of interplanetary smuggling of refugees. It was on one such mission that she ordered her ship Vorga to ignore the distress calls from Nomad.
 Regis Sheffield: A high-priced lawyer working for Presteign, he is actually an agent of the Outer Satellites coalition.
 "Bunny": Sheffield's personal secretary and apparently Chinese, he speaks Mandarin with difficulty and is said to resemble a frightened rabbit, hence his nickname.

Speculative science
The novel included some notable early descriptions of proto-science and fictional technology, among them Bester's portrayal of psionics, including the phenomenon of "jaunting", named after the scientist (Charles Fort Jaunte) who discovered it. Jaunting is the instantaneous teleportation of one's body (and anything one is wearing or carrying). One is able to move up to a thousand miles by just thinking. This suddenly revealed, and near-universal ability, totally disrupts the economic balance between the Inner Planets (Venus, Earth, Mars, and the Moon) and the Outer Satellites (various moons of Jupiter, Saturn, and Neptune), eventually leading to a war between the two. Jaunting has other effects on the social fabric of the novel's world, and these are examined in true science-fictional fashion. Women of the upper classes are locked away in -proof rooms "for their protection", the treatment of criminals of necessity goes back to the Victorian "separate system", and freaks and monsters abound.

The second significant technology in the novel is the rare substance known as "PyrE", an extremely powerful explosive which is activated by telepathy. Possession of PyrE and knowledge of the means to detonate it is believed by both sides to be key to winning the interplanetary war.
 
Bester's description of synesthesia is the first popular account published in the English language and is also quite accurate.

Reception and influence
Initially, reviews of The Stars My Destination were mixed. The well-regarded science fiction writer and critic Damon Knight, in In Search of Wonder (1956), wrote of the novel's "bad taste, inconsistency, irrationality, and downright factual errors", but called the ending of the book "grotesquely moving". In a profile of Bester for Continuum Encyclopedia of American Literature (2005), critic Steven H. Gale cited the novel as a reflection of the author's maturation, addressing as it does "the continued evolution of humankind as a species", a grander theme than those treated with in his earlier work. Gale declared the novel to be Bester's most stylistically ambitious work, citing the use of disparate fonts to evoke synaesthesia, the progressively intelligent language accorded to the maturing protagonist, and the framing of the narrative between the variations on Blake's quatrain.

The book has received high praise from several science fiction writers. After criticizing unrealistic science fiction, Carl Sagan in 1978 listed The Stars My Destination as among stories "that are so tautly constructed, so rich in the accommodating details of an unfamiliar society that they sweep me along before I have even a chance to be critical". By 1987, when the author died, "it was apparent that the 1980s genre  owed an enormous debt to Bester and to this book in particular", Neil Gaiman wrote in the introduction to a 1999 edition of the book: "The Stars My Destination is, after all, the perfect cyberpunk novel: it contains such cheerfully protocyber elements as multinational corporate intrigue; a dangerous, mysterious, hyperscientific MacGuffin (PyrE); an amoral hero; a supercool thief-woman..." James Lovegrove called it "the very best of Bester", and Thomas M. Disch identified it as "one of the great sf novels of the 1950s". Joe Haldeman wrote: "Our field has produced only a few works of actual genius, and this is one of them", who also added that he reads the novel "every two or three years and it still evokes a sense of wonder".

According to Samuel R. Delany, the book is "considered by many to be the greatest single SF novel". while Robert Silverberg wrote that it is "on everybody's list of the ten greatest SF novels". Fantasy writer Michael Moorcock praised it as "a wonderful adventure story" that embodies truly libertarian principles. Ty Franck, co-author of The Expanse series, said: "I don't remember any of the other stories in [A Treasury of Great Science Fiction, Volume Two; an anthology of science fiction stories], and I read that book a dozen times. The only story that sticks out in my mind is The Stars My Destination".

In a 2011 survey asking leading science fiction writers to name their favorite work of the genre, The Stars My Destination was the choice of William Gibson and Moorcock. Gibson remarked that the book was "perfectly surefooted, elegantly pulpy", and "dizzying in its pace and sweep", and a "talisman" for him when undertaking his first novel. Moorcock hailed Bester's novel as a reminder of "why the best science fiction still contains, as in Ballard, vivid imagery and powerful prose coupled to a strong moral vision".

In 2012, the novel was included in the Library of America two-volume boxed set American Science Fiction: Nine Classic Novels of the 1950s, edited by Gary K. Wolfe.

Adaptations
Howard Chaykin and Byron Preiss created a graphic adaptation the first half of which was published in 1979 by Baronet Publishing and the complete version – delayed due to Baronet's bankruptcy after releasing the original version – by Marvel Entertainment's Epic imprint in 1992.

A dramatisation titled Tiger! Tiger! was broadcast on BBC Radio 4 on September 14, 1991 and repeated on August 16, 1993. It was scripted by Ivan Benbrook and directed by Andy Jordan. Alun Armstrong played Gully Foyle, Miranda Richardson was Olivia, Siobhan Redmond was Robin Wednesbury and Lesley Manville was Jisbella McQueen.

A 2004 anime series, Gankutsuou: The Count of Monte Cristo, was originally intended as an adaptation of The Stars My Destination, the copyright holders' refusal to allow an adaptation led the director, Mahiro Maeda, to instead use The Count of Monte Cristo, which had inspired Bester's story.

Various film adaptations of the book have been scripted but none has yet made it to the screen. While the novel has long been considered an "unfilmable" science fiction work, the screen rights were acquired by Universal Pictures in 2006 and by Paramount Pictures in 2015.

In popular culture
 Stephen King refers to The Stars My Destination in several works. In Lisey's Story (2006), the title character recalls it as her deceased husband's favorite novel. The short story "The Jaunt" (1981) takes its title from the book, and explicitly names and references it at several points. 
 Gully Foyle makes a cameo appearance as an agent for the Jurisfiction organisation in the BookWorld of author Jasper Fforde's Thursday Next series. Another novel in the series, The Well of Lost Plots, uses Stars My Destination as the title of a tabloid newspaper in the fictional universe of Emperor Zhark.
 The novel inspired the song "Tiger! Tiger!" by the heavy metal band Slough Feg, which appeared on their 2007 album Hardworlder, the cover of which depicts Gully Foyle.
 "The Stars Our Destination" is the name of a song on the 1994 Stereolab album Mars Audiac Quintet.
 The British TV series The Tomorrow People uses "jaunting" to refer to teleportation.
 In the 2000 video game Deus Ex, Gully Foyle is listed as a current resident of the 'Ton Hotel.
 The character "Enzo Paulo Gugino" in John Scalzi's novel Zoe's Tale wrote a poem entitled "The Stars My Destination" based on "the title from an obscure fantasy adventure book that he'd never read but whose title stayed with him".
 The character Alfred Bester (Babylon 5) is named after the author.
 In Crooked Little Vein by Warren Ellis, the novel, and more specifically the element PyrE, is referenced by Zack Pickles when explaining to protagonist Michael McGill the impact of rebel journalism on society and the power structure of society as a whole.
 In the novel Death's End by Cixin Liu, the Planetary Defense Council adopts Resolution 479, initiating the Stars Our Destination Project.
 Stars My Destination was the title of a year-long story arc in Starman comics.
 In the mobile game Tokyo Afterschool Summoners, the lore of the character Nomad is heavily based on the contents of the book, as well as the poem "The Tyger".
 The Southern California hardcore punk band NASA Space Universe released a compilation album entitled "The Stars My Destination" in 2015.

References
Notes

Sources

External links
 
 The Stars My Destination parts 1, 2, 3, and 4 at the Internet Archive
 John Baxter reviews The Stars My Destination at US National Public Radio
 The Stars My Destination at Encyclopedia Astronautica

1956 American novels
1956 science fiction novels
American science fiction novels
Fiction set on Ceres (dwarf planet)
Fiction about main-belt asteroids
Novels set on Mars
Novels by Alfred Bester
Novels first published in serial form
Novels about rape
Works originally published in Galaxy Science Fiction
Novels republished in the Library of America
Works based on The Count of Monte Cristo
Novels adapted into radio programs
Sidgwick & Jackson books
Novels based on works by Alexandre Dumas